Andrea Cinciarini (born 21 June 1986) is an Italian professional basketball player for Pallacanestro Reggiana of the Italian Lega Basket Serie A (LBA).

Professional career
In 2012 he signed with Pallacanestro Reggiana.

On 27 April 2014 Cinciarini won the European 3rd-tier league, the EuroChallenge. He also received the EuroChallenge Final Four MVP award, after he had 7 points and 7 assists in the Final, in which Reggiana beat Triumph Lyubertsy 65–79.

On 9 July 2015 Cinciarini signed a multi-year deal with Olimpia Milano. After six seasons in Milano where he was the team captain, he parted ways on 10 August 2021. He returned to Reggio Emilia, signing a three years contract.

National team career
Since 2009, Cinciarini has been a part of the senior men's Italian national team.

He was called up to the squad that would take part in EuroBasket 2015, which began on 5 September.

Career statistics

Euroleague

|-
| style="text-align:left;" | 2011–12
| style="text-align:left;" | Bennet Cantù
| 16 || 16 || 25.3 || .380 || .348 || .714 || 2.6 || 2.3 || 0.4 || 0.1 || 5.2 || 4.8
|-
| style="text-align:left;" | 2015–16
| style="text-align:left;" rowspan="4"| Olimpia Milano
| 8 || 7 || 21.9 || .381 || .500 || .600 || 2.1 || 3.1 || 1.0 || 0.0 || 5.4 || 5.4
|-
| style="text-align:left;" | 2016–17
| 23 || 9 || 18.5 || .455 || .250 || .700 || 2.4 || 2.2 || 0.7 || 0.1 || 5.5 || 6.0
|-
| style="text-align:left;" | 2017–18
| 24 || 8 || 13.5 || .505 || .474 || .800 || 2.4 || 2.1 || 0.3 || 0.0 || 4.5 || 6.0
|-
| style="text-align:left;" | 2018–19
| 14 || 5 || 11.2 || .528 || .333 || .375 || 1.4 || 0.9 || 0.5 || 0.1 || 3.2 || 2.4

References

External links
Italian league profile
Eurobasket2013.org profile

1986 births
Living people
Italian men's basketball players
Lega Basket Serie A players
Olimpia Milano players
Pallacanestro Cantù players
Pallacanestro Pavia players
Pallacanestro Reggiana players
Sportspeople from the Province of Rimini
Pistoia Basket 2000 players
Point guards
Sutor Basket Montegranaro players
Victoria Libertas Pallacanestro players